Roomies is an informal synonym of roommates and may also refer to:
Roomies (TV series), a 1987 American sitcom
Roomies! a webcomic by David Willis
"Roomies", episode 22 of season 1 of The Penguins of Madagascar

See also
Roomie (mascot) of the Southeastern Louisiana Lions and Lady Lions
RoomieOfficial (Joel Berghult), Swedish Youtuber and singer